Harini Football Team, also known as Harini, is a Malaysian professional football club based in Jalan Klang Lama, Selangor. They currently play in the second division of Malaysian football, the Malaysia M3 League.

History
Batu Dua FC that completed the 2019 M3 League got renamed after the Harini Sdn Bhd company based in Kuala Selangor. The key factor of the branding was to strengthen the club's financial position which saved the Batu Dua FC, team which suffered financial difficulties in the last season.

After being named Harini FC, the team played the 2020 Malaysia M3 League season, while Harini FC II joined the FAS Premier League.

Harini FC also participated in the 2020 Malaysia FA Cup for the first time.

Players

First-team squad

Management team

Club personnel
 Head coach:  P. Maniam 
 Assistant coach :  P. Somasundram
 Goalkeeping coach:  V. Murugan 
 Fitness coach:  M. Lingeswaran 
 Physio :  Muhammad Fikri Enidzullah

Season by season record

Notes:   2020 Season cancelled due to the COVID-19 pandemic, no promotion or league title was awarded.

Kit manufacturer and shirt sponsor

Honours
Domestic competitions
League
 South Selangor League Winners (1) : 2018

 KL City League Winners (1) : 2019

Cups
 Selangor Champions League Winners (1)' : 2019

References

Malaysia M3 League
Football clubs in Malaysia